Sledd is an unincorporated community in southeast Pike County, in the U.S. state of Missouri.

The community is on Missouri Route W two miles south of Paynesville and approximately one-half mile north of the Pike-Lincoln county line. Guinns Creek flows past the north side of the community.

History
A post office called Sledd was established in 1891, and remained in operation until 1901. Alexander Sledd, an early postmaster, gave the community his last name.

References

Unincorporated communities in Pike County, Missouri
Unincorporated communities in Missouri